The 1000 Kilometres of Catalunya was a sports car race held at the Circuit de Catalunya in Montmeló, Catalonia, Spain.  The race began as a non-championship event at the Montjuïc circuit in 1954.

Results

References

External links
Racing Sports Cars: Montjuich archive, Barcelona archive
World Sports Racing Prototypes: Non-championship archive, ESCC archive

European Le Mans Series races
Auto races in Catalonia
Auto races in Spain
Sports car races